The 2012 Aceh Governor Cup was played at Harapan Bangsa Stadium, Banda Aceh, Indonesia from 15 to 23 December 2012.

Venues
Venues; 2012 Aceh Governor Cup at the Harapan Bangsa Stadium in Banda Aceh, Indonesia. Capacity Stadium : 45,000

Group stage
All matches were played in Indonesia.
Times listed are UTC+7.

Group A

Group B

Knockout stage

Semi-final

Third Place

Final

Goalscorers
6 goals
 Edward Junior Wilson

3 goals
 Titus Bonai

2 goals
 Mohd Shahrazen Said
 Dimitri Petratos

1 goal

 Azwan Salleh
 João Moreira
 Fahrizal Dilla
 Defri Rizki
 Hendra Bayauw
 Ismed Sofyan
 Jakson
 Mahdi Senegal

 Reza Fandi
 Muhammad Syakir
 Muhammad Rizal
 Mukhlis Nakata
 Badhri Radzi
 Francis Doe Forkey
 Ramzul Zahini

2011–12 in Indonesian football
2012
2012 in Malaysian football
2012 in Brunei football